Andrew James Hoole (born 22 October 1993) is an Australian professional football (soccer) player who last played as a winger for Broadmeadow Magic in the National Premier Leagues Northern NSW.

Club career

Newcastle Jets
Hoole earned his first call up for the Jets after impressing in the Newcastle Jets Youth League squad. Hoole played his first game on 12 January 2013 in a round 15 game against the Brisbane Roar. Hoole made a strong debut for the Jets and made a big contribution towards their 1–0 win. Just days after making his A-League debut Hoole signed a one-year senior contract with Newcastle. During the 13/14 season Hoole was voted Player of the Season. On 17 April 2015, he scored his first ever career goal, a penalty, against Sydney FC.

Sydney FC
On 30 April 2015 it was announced he had signed with A-League side Sydney FC on a two-year deal, after 3 successful seasons with Newcastle Jets.

Hoole's contract was terminated by mutual consent on 20 June 2016, one year early in order to pursue other opportunities.

Return to Newcastle Jets
Following Hoole's release from Sydney FC, he returned to Newcastle Jets, signing a one-year contract. In his third game on return for the Jets he got an assist and scored a late free kick to salvage a comeback from 2–0 down to draw 2–2 against the Western Sydney Wanderers.

Central Coast Mariners
Despite announcements to go play in Europe, on 31 May 2017, Hoole signed a two-year contract with Central Coast Mariners. On 14 October 2017, he was shown a red card in his first game. During his time there, he scored eight league goals, including two free kicks in a 3–2 loss to Melbourne Victory in 2019.

Broadmeadow Magic

In 2019, Hoole signed for Broadmeadow Magic in the Australian National Premier Leagues Northern NSW, making his first match debut in 0–0 draw with Edgeworth.

Career statistics

Club

Honours

Personal

 Newcastle Jets Player of the Year – 2014–15
 Ray Baartz Medal – 2014–15

References

External links
 Newcastle Jets profile 
 football-lineups.com profile
 
 

1993 births
Living people
Australian soccer players
Australia under-20 international soccer players
Newcastle Jets FC players
Central Coast Mariners FC players
Sydney FC players
Broadmeadow Magic FC players
Association football wingers